Stringfellow may refer to:

Fictional characters
 Stringfellow (comics), fictional character of Marvel Comics
 Stringfellow Hawke, fictional character from television series Airwolf

People

Other
 Stringfellow Acid Pits, a US Environmental Protection Agency Superfund site in California.